Boiga dendrophila, commonly called the mangrove snake or the gold-ringed cat snake, is a species of rear-fanged venomous snake in the family Colubridae. The species is endemic to southeast Asia. It is one of the biggest cat snake species, averaging 6–7 feet (1.8–2.1 m) in length. It is considered mildly venomous. Although moderate envenomations resulting in intense swelling have been reported, there has never been a confirmed fatality.

Description
B. dendrophila has the following characteristics: Snout longer than eye; rostral broader than deep, visible  from above; internasals as long as or shorter than the prae-frontals; frontal as long as or slightly shorter than its distance from the tip of the snout; loreal at least as long as deep; a praeocular extending to the upper surface of the head, not reaching the frontal; two postoculars; temporals 2 + 2 or 2 + 3; eight (nine) upper labials, third to fifth entering the eye; four or five lower labials in contact with the anterior chin-shields; latter as long as or longer than the posterior; anterior palatine teeth not much larger than the posterior. 
Scales in 21 (23) rows, vertebral row enlarged; ventrals 209–239; anal entire; subcaudals 89. Black above, with yellow transverse bands, continuous or not extending across the back; labials yellow, with black edges. Lower surface black or bluish, uniform or speckled with yellow; throat yellow. Total length (including tail) .

Behavior
Mostly nocturnal, B. dendrophila is a potentially aggressive snake. Even captive bred specimens can be nervous and may strike repeatedly. Although many specimens will calm down and allow handling, it is normally easily stressed and may refuse food for extended periods of time if disturbed. Handling, of course, should involve safety precautions for the handler, due to the snake's nervous nature and the fact that a bite can cause pain and injury.

Geographic range
B. dendrophila is found in Cambodia, Indonesia (Bangka, Belitung, Borneo, Java, Riau Archipelago, Sulawesi, Sumatra), Malaysia, Myanmar, the Philippines, Singapore, Thailand, and Vietnam.

Subspecies
Including the nominotypical subspecies, nine subspecies are recognized as being valid.

Nota bene: A trinomial authority in parentheses indicates that the subspecies was originally described in a genus other than Boiga.

Boiga dendrophila annectens  – Indonesia (Kalimantan); Brunei Darussalam; East Malaysia
Boiga dendrophila dendrophila  – Indonesia (Java).
Boiga dendrophila divergens  – Philippines (Luzon, Polillo)
Boiga dendrophila gemmicincta  – Indonesia (Sulawesi).
Boiga dendrophila latifasciata  – Philippines (Mindanao)
Boiga dendrophila levitoni  – Panay (and probably other islands of the West Visayas region)
Boiga dendrophila melanota  – S Thailand, West Malaysia, Singapore, Indonesia (Sumatra)
Boiga dendrophila multicincta  – Philippines (Balabac, Palawan)
Boiga dendrophila occidentalis  – Indonesia (Babi, Batu Archipelago, Nias, Sumatra)

The subspecific name, levitoni, is in honor of American herpetologist Alan E. Leviton (born 1930).

Habitat
Despite one of its common names, mangrove snake, B. dendrophila is found more often in lowland rainforests than in the mangrove swamps from which its common name is derived.

Diet
B. dendrophila feeds on reptiles, birds, and small mammals in the wild.

Venom
In common with other colubrids, mangrove snakes have a Duvernoy's gland on the posterior end of the eye with a duct that connects to the rear fangs. The snake needs to chew in order to release the venom, which is released gradually. The venom of the mangrove cat snake is weak, the fangs in the rear are not large, and it is difficult for the snake to open its mouth wide enough to sink the fangs into a human leg or arm; as of 2016, there are no confirmed fatalities. Denmotoxin is a three-finger toxin that has been identified in the venom of mangrove cat snakes, and is the first fully characterized bird-specific toxin.

Although envenomation of humans is mild, visually, because of the alternation of black and yellow crossbands and triangular body cross section, the mangrove cat snake can be confused with the banded krait, which is extremely venomous.

Gallery

References

Further reading
Boie F (1827). "Bemerkungen über Merrem's Versuch eines Systems der Amphibien, 1. Lieferung: Ophidier". Isis van Oken, Jena 20: 508–566. (Dipsas dendrophila, p. 549) .
Boulenger GA (1896). Catalogue of the Snakes in the British Museum (Natural History). Volume III. Containing the Colubridæ (Opisthoglyphæ and Proteroglyphæ) ... London: Trustees of the British Museum (Natural History). (Taylor and Francis, printers). xiv + 727 pp. + Plates I-XXV. (Dipsadomorphus dendrophilus, pp. 70–71). (includes new variations: annectens, latifasciatus, melanotus, multicinctus).
Brongersma LD (1934). "Contributions to Indo-Australian herpetology". Zool. Med. 17: 161–251. (Boiga brongersma, p. 200).
Das I (2006). A Photographic Guide to Snakes and other Reptiles of Borneo. Sanibel Island, Florida: Ralph Curtis Books. 144 pp. . (Boiga dendrophila, p. 22).
Ryabov, Sergei A.; Orlov, Nikolai L (2002). "Breeding of Black Mangrove Snake Boiga dendrophila gemmicincta (Duméril, Bibron et Duméril, 1854) (Serpentes: Colubridae: Colubrinae) from Sulawesi Island (Indonesia)". Russ. J. Herpetol. 9 (1): 77–79.

External links 
 

dendrophila
Reptiles described in 1827
Reptiles of Thailand
Reptiles of the Philippines
Snakes of Southeast Asia
Taxa named by Friedrich Boie
Reptiles of Borneo